Gabriel King, was Mayor of Galway in 1657–58.

King oversaw the demolition of the abbey of St. Francis, which had been founded in the 13th century. He was one of the commissioners appointed to determine ownership of lands in County Galway and County Mayo. He was married to a daughter of Anthony Martin, Bishop of Meath (died 1649).

References 
"History of Galway", James Hardiman, 1820
"Old Galway", Maureen Donovan O'Sullivan, 1942
The Tribes of Galway", Adrian J. Martyn, 2001
 Role of Honour:The Mayors of Galway City 1485-2001, William Henry, Galway, 2002.  

Politicians from County Galway
Mayors of Galway
17th-century Irish businesspeople